"Go Your Way" is the eleventh single by South Korean rock band CNBLUE. It was released on August 20, 2014. It will have 2 limited edition, 1 normal edition and 1 BOICE exclusive edition.

Track listing

Limited Edition A

CD Track list

#1: Go Your Way
#2: Control
#3: Monster
#4: Control (Instrumental)

DVD Track list

#1: "ARENA TOUR 2013 ~ONE MORE TIME!~ at NIPPONGAISHI HALL" Multi Angle Coffee shop / One More Time / I’m sorry
#2: "Go Your Way" Music Video
#3: "Go Your Way" Special Feature

Limited Edition B

CD Track list

#1: Go Your Way
#2: Control
#3: Monster
#4: Monster (Instrumental)

DVD Track list

#1: LIVE from SUMMER SONIC 2013 [first half] Where you are / In My Head / Wake up / Blind Love

Standard Edition

CD Track list

#1: Go Your Way
#2: Control
#3: Monster
#4: Go Your Way (Instrumental)

BOICE Limited Edition

CD Track list

#1: Go Your Way
#2: Control
#3: Monster
#4: Go Your Way (Instrumental)

DVD Track list

#1: LIVE & DIGEST from Official Fanmeeting 2014 [first half] Can’t Stop / Blind Love / Greedy Man

References

2014 singles
2014 songs
CNBLUE songs
Japanese-language songs
Warner Music Japan singles
Songs written by Jung Yong-hwa